Nobuhle Mimi Mahlasela (born 10 April 1982), is a South African actress and model. She is best known for playing the role of Aggie Ngwenya-Meintjies in the popular serial 7de Laan.

Personal life
Mahlasela was born on 10 April 1982 in Baragwanath Hospital in Soweto, South Africa. In 1999, she matriculated at Waverley Girls High School in Johannesburg. Then she studied drama from Pretoria Technikon, which is currently known as Tshwane University of Technology (TUT).

Career
Before entering television, she played a secretary for an ABSA in-house advertisement. In 2012, she made her film debut with Mad Buddies and played the minor role of a female traffic cop. In 2016, she made the role of Nthati in the film My Father's War.

She has played the role of Aggie Ngwenya-Meintjies on the popular television serial 7de Laan since 2010. The character became highly popular, and as a result she was then invited to play the role for several seasons in the regular cast.

Filmography

References

External links
 
 'Don't be mean': Nobuhle Mahlasela & Mvelo Makhanya take on cyberbullies
 Nobuhle Mahlasela shows off her bikini bod
 Sing along with 7de Laan's beloved 'Aggie' as the actress spins her favourite hits from the 80s and 90s
 13 Fun Facts About Mimi Mahlasela
 Steal her style: Here’s where to get ‘7de Laan’ actress Nobuhle Mahlasela’s cool kimono

Living people
South African television actresses
South African film actresses
1982 births
People from Soweto